The Women's javelin throw athletics events for the 2012 Summer Paralympics took place at the London Olympic Stadium from August 31 to September 8. A total of 6 events were contested over this distance for 14 different classifications.

Results

F12/13

F33/34/52/53

F37/38

F46

F54/55/56

F57/58

References

Athletics at the 2012 Summer Paralympics
2012 in women's athletics
Women's sport in London